Neeleshwaram River (also known as Thejaswini River) originates from the western slopes of the Greater Talacauvery National Park in the Western Ghats, Karnataka. It is the second longest river in the Kasargod district after the Chandragiri River. The 56 km long Thejaswini River flows through the Kasargod district eventually emptying into the Kavvayi Backwaters.

Course
The Thejaswini River originates from the western slopes of the Greater Talacauvery National Park in the Brahmagiri hill ranges of the Western Ghats in Karnataka. Initially the river flows through several eastern hilly towns of the Kasargod district namely, Kozhichal, Odakolly, Palavayal, Pulingome, Theyyeni, Nallompuzha, Cherupuzha, Kadumeni, Kamballur, Vayakkara, Peralam, Bedhur, Perumbatta and Cheemeni. The river then enters the Malabar plains where it passes the towns of Karinthalam, Choyamkode, Kayyoor, Kilayikode and Nileshwaram. At reaching Nileshwaram, it's tributary Kariangode River merges with it. Thejaswini then flows through Kariyil, Thuruthy and Thaikkadappuram. At Thuruthy, it bends south emptying into the Kavvayi estuary.

Tributaries 
Edathod river and Mayanganam river are the two tributaries of Neeleshwaram river.

References

Rivers of Kasaragod district